Broadway  is a small community in the Canadian province of Nova Scotia, located in Pictou County. It is on Nova Scotia Trunk 4.

References

Communities in Pictou County